Rongker is an annual winter time festival of merriment observed by the Karbis of Assam. It is also known as Dehal in Dumra Longri i.e. Kamrup Metropolitan district of Assam and Ri-Bhoi district of Meghalaya. It is observed in order to appease the local deities, associated with the welfare of the village and the harvest of crops and also to get rid of all evil happenings.

Time of the festival
The festival does  have specific time although it is usually observed at the beginning of the Karbi New year February(Thang thang) 5. Different villages may observe it at different time depending entirely on their convenience.

The set-up of the site
10 earthen altars against all the deities are installed in the eastern side of the site where the festival is to be held. They are constructed in a row heading south-north direction and named after the deities. The shape of the altars are made in such a manner so that the respective gods can rest there comfortably. Although 12 deities are worshiped, only 10 altars are set up since Hemphu, and Rasinja are regarded as brothers and sister, Mukrang is the husband of Rasinja and they share a common altar. A gourd with tapering mouth full of the first made rice beer is placed on the altars in the name of the respective deity. Although except the gourd full of rice beer, nothing else is placed on the altars, however, two small branches of bamboo are erected on the altar of Ningding Sarpo, a few branches of Basil and a few bamboo sticks are erected on the altar of Murti and a branch of Fongrong (a kind of tree used for worshipping god) is placed on the altar of Arlok.

The rituals
The festival lasts for three days. All the villagers contributes in cash and kinds and donation are also collected from the neighbouring villages in order to meet the expenses of the rituals. The festival is divided into four major parts:
Sadi
In this process all the deities are invited.
Karkli
Here the deities are worshipped in two ways – Kibo-kaba, offering of meals to the deities and Koia-abida, offering of areca-nut and betel leaves to the deities. The entire man-folk take part in the festival. They gather in the particular site in the morning with all necessary items required to worship. The main task is performed by the Kurusar, the main priest. He is assisted by some other religious specialists, the village headman, an official of the Karbi Kingdom, the youth leader of the village and a few elderly villagers well versed in worshipping the deities. It is not mandatory to take bath before performing the rituals but they must be purified by sprinkling water with the leaves of the sacred basil. All the sacrifices are made in the names of the deities except for the deity Bamun, who is vegetarian. Then the thek-kere, the religious specialists predicts the future of the village at the heart and intestine of the sacrificed animals. At the end of the rituals a feast is organised.
Rongphu-Rongling-Kangthin
It is also called the Ajo-Rongker and performed at the night of the second day. In this part,  the evil spirits are driven out from the lower to the upper part of the village by way of dancing. An altar is made at the end of the village road and a chicken is sacrificed in the name of Ajo-Angtarpi.
Langhe Rongker
This is the concluding part of the festival observed at the third day of the festival. It is performed near a ghat by making an altar and sacrificing a cock in the name of Arnam-teke, he tiger god, to prevent tigers from attacking.

Deities worshipped
During this festival total 12 deities are worshipped. They are namely:
Longri sarpo: The presiding as well as the village-god of the host village. This deity is responsible for the welfare of the Longri (Kingdom or jurisdiction).
Hemphu: The supreme household god of the Karbis.
Mukrang: The second household god, next to the Hemphu.
Rasinja: The household goddess.
Bamun: The local vegetarian deity.
Ningding Sarpo: The god of Patience.
Rit-Anglong: The deity in-charge of agriculture.
Than: The local deity, living in jungle, who is responsible for protecting the crops and people from wild animals and insects etc.
Murti: The headless malevolent spirit who lives in a hole under the earth.
Arlock: The deity that lives in a land standing between two hills.
Kuthepi: The deity responsible for looking over Kuthepi territory.
Theng: The deity living in the jungle who cures diseases like flue, ache, headache, tooth-ache and other physical pains.

Taboo observed
During this festival some taboos are observed. They include:
Husking is prohibited
The female folk is not allowed to participate in the festival
None is allowed for any type of agricultural activities
No villager is allowed to leave the village.

Some Karbi words associated with the festival
Duwan: Altar
Horbong: A gourd with tapering mouth ( kind of Indonesian bottle gourd), for holding rice beer.
Horso: first made rice beer offered to the deity
Kurusar: The main priest
Deuri, Barwa, Thek-kere: These are all religions specialists
Burtaman: An official of the Karbi Kingdom
Rong-A-sarthe: Village headman
Riso Basa: Youth leader of the village
Arnam-teke: The tiger god
Aar: Jhum cultivation

See also
Assamese Culture
Karbi Youth Festival

References

External links
Rongker and Chomangkan at Indian Travel Portal
Rongker Festival at India9
Rongker and Chomangkan at Assam Tourism
Rongker and Chomangkan at Locate India

Festivals in Assam